Odonteuxina is a subgenus of air-breathing land snails with a clausilium, terrestrial gastropod mollusks in the family Clausiliidae, the door snails. This subgenus is in the genus Euxinastra.

Species
 Odonteuxina iberica (Roth 1850)
 Odonteuxina harchbelica Páll-Gergely 2010

References

External links

Clausiliidae
Gastropod subgenera